Paul Alexander McMullan (born 13 March 1984) is a Scottish professional football midfielder currently without a club having last played for East Stirlingshire. He has previously played in the Scottish Premier League for Heart of Midlothian.

Career
McMullan started his career at Heart of Midlothian, making his senior début on 16 February 2002, in a match away to Kilmarnock. During his four-year spell at Hearts, he went on to play a role in the club's 2002–03 season, when the club finished third in the Scottish Premier League. McMullan played in two Edinburgh derby matches that season, including a game that Hearts won 5–1 at Tynecastle in August 2002. McMullan left on a loan period to Queen of the South in December 2003, before leaving Hearts in the summer of 2004.

After joining Inverness Caledonian Thistle, McMullan moved to Raith Rovers in January 2005, without making a league appearance for the Highland club. McMullan then had an eight-month spell in Australia with Sorrento FC in the Western Australia State League, before returning to Scotland in January 2006, to play for Hamilton Academical. The player later moved on to Stranraer and Berwick Rangers and had a season at junior level with Glenafton Athletic where he reunited with his former manager at Raith, Gordon Dalziel.

McMullan signed for Clyde in January 2011, before moving to Elgin City in January 2012.

On 21 May 2014, McMullan signed for East Stirlingshire, but having only made three appearances for the club due to injury, his contract was cancelled by mutual consent in January 2015.

References

External links

 (Berwick, Clyde – incorrectly named Paul McMullen)
Paul McMullan profile at London Hearts

1984 births
Living people
Scottish footballers
Heart of Midlothian F.C. players
Queen of the South F.C. players
Inverness Caledonian Thistle F.C. players
Raith Rovers F.C. players
Hamilton Academical F.C. players
Stranraer F.C. players
Berwick Rangers F.C. players
Glenafton Athletic F.C. players
Clyde F.C. players
Elgin City F.C. players
East Stirlingshire F.C. players
Scottish Football League players
Scottish Premier League players
Scottish Junior Football Association players
Scottish expatriate footballers
Scottish expatriate sportspeople in Australia
Footballers from Bellshill
Association football midfielders
Scottish Professional Football League players